Farid Alfonso Díaz Rhenals (born 20 July 1983) is a Colombian professional footballer who plays as a left back for Club Nacional.

Career
Díaz made his international debut against Panama on 9 May 2007. In May 2018, he was named in the preliminary squad for the 2018 FIFA World Cup. Although initially not being picked in the final list, he was later called up as a replacement for the injured Frank Fabra.

Career statistics

Club

Notes

International

Honours
Olimpia
 Primera División: 2018 Apertura

Atlético Nacional
Copa Libertadores: 2016
Categoría Primera A: 2013-I, 2013-II, 2014-I, 2015-II, 2017-I
Copa Colombia: 2012, 2013, 2016
Superliga Colombiana: 2012, 2016

Envigado
Categoría Primera B: 2007

Colombia
Copa América third place: 2016

References

External links

1983 births
Living people
Colombian footballers
Colombia international footballers
Colombian expatriate footballers
Paraguayan Primera División players
Categoría Primera A players
Categoría Primera B players
Atlético Bucaramanga footballers
Leones F.C. footballers
Atlético Junior footballers
La Equidad footballers
Envigado F.C. players
Deportivo Pereira footballers
Atlético Nacional footballers
Club Olimpia footballers
Valledupar F.C. footballers
Alianza Petrolera players
Club Nacional footballers
Association football fullbacks
Copa América Centenario players
2018 FIFA World Cup players
Colombian people of African descent
Expatriate footballers in Paraguay
Colombian expatriate sportspeople in Paraguay
People from Cesar Department